Mediodactylus sagittifer, also known as the Jaz Murian bent-toed gecko or Bampur thin-toed gecko, is a species of lizard in the family Gekkonidae. It is found in southeastern Iran and in Pakistan.

References

Mediodactylus
Reptiles of Iran
Reptiles of Pakistan
Reptiles described in 1900
Taxa named by Alexander Nikolsky